Poomani (born 1947) is an Indian writer and novelist. He won the Sahitya Akademi award in 2014 in the Tamil language category for his novel Agnaadi.

Life and works

Poomani was born in 1947 into a family of marginal farmers in Andipatti, a village near Kovilpatti.

In his youth, Poomani was enchanted by the stories he heard around him growing up, as told by his mother and in his community. As a young man, the works of Ki. Rajanarayanan, a senior writer from Kovilpatti, inspired Poomani to take up writing. According to Poomani, KiRa combined in his writing "the scent of the soil with the natural flow of life's energies to enable the writing to develop its own traits, instead of borrowing from other models". He was also influenced by P. Kesavadev's Malayalam novel, Ayalkar, published in English as The Neighbours (1979). Poomani found in Ayalkar a worthy model: "It is a strong story, told with an aesthetic narrative style and keen imagination. The imagination adds lustre to the nature of the story, instead of dominating it. Changes and values arise anew on their own. The narration brings many things alive for the reader, carries him to the terrain of the story and stands him there. It makes him walk alongside, cry and laugh. When everything is wrapped up at the end, it makes him think."

Poomani's historical novel Agnaadi (January 2012) has been called "a landmark work". It covers a period of more than 170 years from the beginning of the 19th century, revolving mainly around the lives and fortunes of several families dispersed over villages in the region: Kalingal, Kazhugumalai, Chatrapatti, Veppankadu, Chinnaiahpuram and Sivakasi. The families are from a range of castes (Devendrakula Velalars, Vannaars, Panaiyeri Nadars, Naickers and Thevars) and occupations (farmers, washermen, toddy-tappers, landed squires and warriors). Poomani received a 28-month study and research grant from Indian Foundation of the Arts in Bengaluru to study the history of the novel. The novel won the inaugural Gitanjali Literary Prize.

Poomani's Vekaai was also translated from Tamil to English by N. Kalyan Raman and published as Heat (2019) by Juggernaut Books.

Poomani's debut novel and one of the pioneering subaltern novels of Tamil Nadu "Piragu" has been translated into English by T. Marx and published as "And Then" by Emerald Publishers (December 2019) 
Poomani directed the award-winning movie Karuvelam Pookkal (1996) for NFDC.

Awards
1996 Tamil Nadu State Film Award Special Prize for the film Karuvelam Pookkal (dir. Poomani)
2011 Vishnupuram Award for his contribution to literature
2012 Gitanjali Literary Prize for Agnaadi
2014 Sahitya Akademi Award for Agnaadi

Bibliography
Novels
 Agnaadi
 Piragu
 Vekkai
 Varappugal
 Vaaikkal
 Neivethiyam
 Kommai

Short story collections
 Vayirugal
 Reethi
 Norungalkal

Film
 Karuvelam Pookkal

References

External links
 Blog coverage
 

Tamil-language writers
Indian postmodern writers
Living people
Tamil writers
People from Thoothukudi district
1947 births
Novelists from Tamil Nadu
Screenwriters from Tamil Nadu
20th-century Indian novelists
21st-century Indian novelists
Recipients of the Sahitya Akademi Award in Tamil